Duncan Macmillan, FRSA, FRSE, HRSA, is a Scottish art historian, art critic, and writer.

Biography
He is the elder son of William Miller Macmillan. Born in 1939, and educated at Gordonstoun School, he obtained his MA degree at the University of St Andrews, his Academic Diploma at the University of London, and his PhD at the University of Edinburgh. He is an honorary graduate of the University of Dundee. Macmillan is Professor Emeritus of the History of Scottish Art at the University of Edinburgh, and a former Curator of the Talbot Rice Gallery. Between 2008 and 2012 he was curator of the Royal Society of Edinburgh. He is also art critic for The Scotsman.

Works

His works include Painting in Scotland: the Golden Age (Oxford 1986), and Scottish Art 1460-1990 (Edinburgh 2000), According to Cairns Craig, the book views Scottish art as emanating from public art practices of the Protestant Reformation. The Times Literary Supplement considered that Macmillan was excellent on the Renaissance but later prone to "a certain unevenness". Nonetheless, the "TLS" praised his "intellectual underpinning" and treatments of William Quiller Orchardson and William McTaggart.  In 1991 this book won the Saltire Society Scottish Book of the Year award. Macmillan's works also include Scottish Art in the 20th Century (Edinburgh 1994, Scottish Arts Council Book Award), and Scotland's Shrine: The Scottish National War Memorial, which is accompanied by a foreword by Her Majesty Queen Elizabeth II (Lund Humphries, 2014).
 
Macmillan is author of monographs on Scottish and European artists, including Will Maclean, Steven Campbell, Elizabeth Blackadder, Victoria Crowe, and (with Tom Hewlett) of FCB Cadell. His 2015 critique of intellectual and moral probity in the contemporary art world, entitled The Thought Police, appeared in Treason of the Scholars.

Distinctions
In 2004 he was awarded the Henry Duncan Prize for his contribution to Scottish Historiography by the Royal Society of Edinburgh.

In 2005 he was awarded the Andrew Fletcher of Saltoun Prize for his contribution to Scottish life by the Saltire Society.

In 2018 he was awarded the Sir Walter Scott Medal of the Royal Society of Edinburgh for his outstanding contribution to the appreciation of Scottish Art and its place within the European Tradition.

Bibliography

Books
 Duncan Macmillan, Painting in Scotland: the Golden Age (Phaidon, 1986)
 Duncan Macmillan, Scottish Art 1460-1990 (Mainstream, 1990)
 Duncan Macmillan, Symbols of Survival, The Art of Will Maclean (revised edition 2002)
 Duncan Macmillan, Scottish Art in the 20th Century (1994) 
 Duncan Macmillan, Elizabeth Blackadder (Scolar Press, 1999), on Scottish painter and printmaker Elizabeth Blackadder
 Duncan Macmillan, Scottish Art 1460-2000 (Mainstream, 2nd edition, 2000)
 Tom Hewlett and Duncan Macmillan, F.C.B. Cadell: The Life and Works of a Scottish Colourist 1883-1937 (Lund Humphries, 2011)
 Duncan Macmillan, Victoria Crowe (Antique Collectors' Club, 2012), on Scottish artist Victoria Crowe
 Duncan Macmillan, Scotland's Shrine: The Scottish National War Memorial (Lund Humphries, 2014)

Articles
 The Tradition of Painting in Scotland, in Cencrastus No. 1, Autumn 1979, pp. 36 – 38, 
 Scotland and the Art of Nationalism, in Cencrastus No. 4, Winter 1980-81, pp. 33 – 35, 
 Scottish Painting 1500 - 1700, in Hearn, Sheila G. (ed.), Cencrastus No. 15, New Year 1984, pp. 25 - 29, 
 Scottish Painting: Ramsay to Raeburn, in Parker, Geoffrey (ed.), Cencrastus No. 17, Summer 1984, pp. 25 - 29, 
 Scottish Painting: The Later Enlightenment, in Parker, Geoffrey (ed.), Cencrastus No. 19, Winter 1984, pp. 25 - 27,

References

Scottish art historians
Living people
Scottish art critics
People educated at Gordonstoun
Fellows of the Royal Society of Edinburgh
Year of birth missing (living people)